Abbett is a surname. Notable people with the surname include:

 Leon Abbett (1836–1894), American politician and Governor of New Jersey
 Robert K. Abbett (1926–2015), American artist

See also 
 Lord Abbett, an American investment management company

References